Ernst Julius Günther Röhm (28 November 1887 – 1 July 1934) was a German military officer and an early member of the Nazi Party. As one of the members of its predecessor, the German Workers' Party, he was a close friend and early ally of Adolf Hitler. Röhm was eventually made leader of the SA and led a campaign of political violence during the Nazis' rise to power. His relationship with Hitler began to deteriorate once the Nazis seized national power in 1933. As the Nazi government began securing itself, the tension between Hitler and Röhm escalated. Throughout 1933, Röhm attempted to obtain more power for the SA, which the German Army saw as a growing threat to their position. Hitler came to see Röhm as a potential rival and decided to eliminate him. Röhm was executed by the SS in 1934 during the Night of the Long Knives.

Early life and education
Ernst Röhm was born in 1887 in Munich, Kingdom of Bavaria, the youngest of three children—he had an elder sister and brother—of Emilie and Julius Röhm. His father Julius, a railway official, was described as strict, but once he realized that his son responded better without exhortation, allowed him significant freedom to pursue his interests.

On 23 July 1906, Röhm entered the Royal Bavarian 10th Infantry Regiment Prinz Ludwig at Ingolstadt as a cadet even though his family had no military tradition and he was commissioned on 12 March 1908.

Career

At the outbreak of World War I in August 1914, he was adjutant of the 1st Battalion, 10th Infantry Regiment König. The following month, he was seriously wounded in the face at Chanot Wood in Lorraine and carried the scars for the rest of his life. He was promoted to first lieutenant in April 1915. During an attack on the fortification at Thiaumont, Verdun, on 23 June 1916, he sustained a serious chest wound and spent the remainder of the war in France and Romania as a staff officer. He was awarded the Iron Cross First Class before being wounded at Verdun, and was promoted to captain in April 1917. Among his comrades, Röhm was considered a "fanatical, simple-minded swashbuckler" who frequently displayed contempt for danger. In his memoirs, Röhm reported that during the autumn of 1918, he contracted the deadly Spanish influenza and was not expected to live, but recovered after a lengthy convalescence.

He was one of the senior members in Franz Ritter von Epp's  ("Bavarian Free Corps for Border Patrol East"), formed in Ohrdruf in April 1919, which finally overturned the Munich Soviet Republic by force of arms on 3 May 1919. In 1919 he joined the German Workers' Party (DAP), which the following year became the National Socialist German Workers Party (NSDAP). Not long afterward he met Adolf Hitler, and they became political allies and close friends.

In November 1923, Röhm led the  militia at the time of the Munich Beer Hall Putsch. He rented the cavernous main hall of the Löwenbräukeller, supposedly for a reunion and festive comradeship. Meanwhile, Hitler and his entourage were at the Bürgerbräukeller. Röhm planned to start the revolution and use the units at his disposal to obtain weapons from secret caches with which to occupy crucial points in the centre of the city. When the call came, he announced to those assembled in the Löwenbräukeller that the Kahr government had been deposed and Hitler had declared a "national revolution" which elicited wild cheering. Röhm then led his force of nearly 2,000 men to the War Ministry, which they occupied for sixteen hours. Once in control of the  headquarters, Röhm awaited news, barricaded inside. The subsequent march into the city center led by Hitler, Hermann Göring, and General Erich Ludendorff with banners flying high, was ostensibly undertaken to "free" Röhm and his forces.

While crowds cheered, egged on by Gregor Strasser shouting , Hitler's armed assembly, wearing red swastika armbands, encountered Bavarian State Policemen, who were prepared to counter the Putsch. Around the time the marchers reached the Feldherrnhalle near the city center, shots were fired, scattering the participants. By the end of the gunfire, fourteen Nazis and four policemen had been killed; the putsch had failed and the Nazis' first bid for power had lasted less than twenty-four hours.

In February 1924, following the failed putsch, Röhm, Hitler, General Ludendorff, Lieutenant Colonel Hermann Kriebel and six others were tried for high treason. Röhm was found guilty and sentenced to fifteen months in prison, but the sentence was suspended and he was placed on probation. Hitler was found guilty and sentenced to five years' imprisonment, but served only nine months at Landsberg Prison (under permissively lenient conditions).

In April 1924, Röhm became a Reichstag deputy for the völkisch (racial-national) National Socialist Freedom Party.  He made only one speech, urging the release of Lieutenant Colonel Kriebel. In the December 1924 election the seats won by his party were much reduced, and his name was too far down the list to return him to the Reichstag. While Hitler was in prison, Röhm helped to create the Frontbann as a legal alternative to the then-outlawed Sturmabteilung (SA). Hitler did not fully support Röhm´s  ambitious plans for this organization, which proved problematic. Hitler was distrustful of these paramilitary organizations because competing groups like the Bund Wiking, the Bund Bayern und Reich, and the Blücherbund were all vying for membership and he realized from the failed putsch that these groups could not be legitimated so long as the police and Reichswehr stayed loyal to the government. 

When in April 1925 Hitler and Ludendorff disapproved of the proposals under which Röhm was prepared to integrate the 30,000-strong Frontbann into the SA, Röhm resigned from all political groups and military brigades on 1 May 1925. He felt great contempt for the "legalistic" path the party leaders wanted to follow and sought seclusion from public life. 
In 1928, he accepted a post in Bolivia as advisor to the Bolivian Army, where he was given the rank of lieutenant colonel. In the autumn of 1930, Röhm received a telephone call from Hitler requesting his return to Germany.

Sturmabteilung leader

In September 1930, as a consequence of the Stennes Revolt in Berlin, Hitler assumed supreme command of the SA as its new Oberster SA-Führer. He sent a personal request to Röhm, asking him to return to serve as the SA's Chief of Staff. Röhm accepted this offer and began his new assignment on 5 January 1931. He brought radical new ideas to the SA and appointed several close friends to its senior leadership. Previously, the SA formations were subordinate to the Nazi Party leadership of each Gau. Röhm established new Gruppe, which had no regional Nazi Party oversight. Each Gruppe extended over several regions and was commanded by an SA-Gruppenführer who answered only to Röhm or Hitler.

The SA by this time numbered over a million members. Their initial assignment of protecting Nazi leaders at rallies and assemblies was taken over by the Schutzstaffel (SS) in relation to the top leaders. The SA did continue its street battles against the communists, forces of rival political parties and violent actions against Jews and others deemed hostile to the Nazi agenda.

Under Röhm, the SA often took the side of workers in strikes and other labor disputes, attacking strikebreakers and supporting picket lines. SA intimidation contributed to the rise of the Nazis and the violent suppression of rival parties during electoral campaigns, but its reputation for street violence and heavy drinking was a hindrance, as was the rumored homosexuality of Röhm and other SA leaders such as his deputy Edmund Heines. In June 1931, the Münchener Post, a Social Democratic newspaper, began attacking Röhm and the SA regarding homosexuality in its ranks and then in March 1932, the paper obtained and published some private letters of his in which Röhm described himself as "same-sex oriented". These letters had been confiscated by the Berlin police back in 1931 and subsequently passed along to the journalist Helmuth Klotz.

Hitler was aware of Röhm's homosexuality. Their friendship shows in that Röhm remained one of the few intimates allowed to use the familiar German du (the German familiar form of "you") when conversing with Hitler. Röhm was the only Nazi leader who dared to address Hitler by his first name "Adolf" or his nickname "Adi" rather than "". Their close association led to rumors that Hitler himself was homosexual. Unlike many in the Nazi hierarchy, Röhm never fell victim to Hitler's "arresting personality" nor did he come fully under his spell, which made him unique.

As Hitler rose to national power with his appointment as chancellor in January 1933, SA members were appointed auxiliary police and ordered by Göring to sweep aside "all enemies of the state".

Second revolution
Röhm and the SA regarded themselves as the vanguard of the "National Socialist revolution". After Hitler's national takeover they expected radical changes in Germany, including power and rewards for themselves, unaware that, as Chancellor, Hitler no longer needed their street-fighting capabilities.

Nevertheless, Hitler did name Röhm to numerous important Party and State positions. On 2 June 1933, Hitler named him a Reichsleiter, the second highest political rank in the Nazi Party. He was made a member of the Prussian State Council on 14 September and a member of the Academy for German Law on 3 October, advancing to its Leadership Council (Führerrat) in November. On 12 November, Röhm was elected to the Reichstag. Finally, on 2 December 1933, he was named to the Reich cabinet as a Reichsminister without portfolio and made a member of the Reich Defense Council.

Along with other members of the more radical faction within the Nazi Party, Röhm advocated a "second revolution" that was overtly anti-capitalist in its general disposition. These radicals rejected capitalism and they intended to take steps to curb monopolies and promoted the nationalization of land and industry. Such plans were threatening to the business community in general, and to Hitler's corporate financial backers in particular—including many German industrial leaders he would rely upon for arms production. In order to keep from alienating them, Hitler swiftly reassured his powerful industrial allies that there would be no such revolution as espoused by these Party radicals.

Many SA "storm troopers" had working-class origins and longed for a radical transformation of German society. They were disappointed by the new regime's lack of socialistic direction and its failure to provide the lavish patronage they had expected. Furthermore, Röhm and his SA colleagues thought of their force as the core of the future German Army, and saw themselves as replacing the Reichswehr and its established professional officer corps. By then, the SA had swollen to over three million men, dwarfing the Reichswehr, which was limited to 100,000 men by the Treaty of Versailles. Although Röhm had been a member of the officer corps, he viewed them as "old fogies" who lacked "revolutionary spirit". He believed that the Reichswehr should be merged into the SA to form a true "people's army" under his command, a pronouncement that caused significant consternation within the army's hierarchy and convinced them that the SA was a serious threat. At a February 1934 cabinet meeting, Röhm then demanded that the merger be made, under his leadership as Minister of Defence.

This horrified the army, with its traditions going back to Frederick the Great. The army officer corps viewed the SA as an "undisciplined mob" of "brawling" street thugs, and was also concerned by the pervasiveness of "corrupt morals" within the ranks of the SA. Reports of a huge cache of weapons in the hands of SA members caused additional concern to the army leadership. Unsurprisingly, the officer corps opposed Röhm's proposal. They insisted that discipline and honor would vanish if the SA gained control, but Röhm and the SA would settle for nothing less. In addition the army leadership was eager to co-operate with Hitler given his plan of re-armament and expansion of the established professional military forces.

In February 1934, Hitler told British diplomat Anthony Eden of his plan to reduce the SA by two-thirds. That same month, Hitler announced that the SA would be left with only a few minor military functions. Röhm responded with complaints, and began expanding the armed elements of the SA. Speculation that the SA was planning a coup against Hitler became widespread in Berlin. In March, Röhm offered a compromise in which "only" a few thousand SA leaders would be taken into the army, but the army promptly rejected that idea.

On 11 April 1934, Hitler met with German military leaders on the ship Deutschland. By that time, he knew President Paul von Hindenburg would likely die before the end of the year. Hitler informed the army hierarchy of Hindenburg's declining health and proposed that the Reichswehr support him as Hindenburg's successor. In exchange, he offered to reduce the SA, suppress Röhm's ambitions, and guarantee the Reichswehr would be Germany's only military force. According to war correspondent William L. Shirer, Hitler also promised to expand the army and navy.

Although determined to curb the power of the SA, Hitler put off doing away with his long-time ally. A political struggle within the party grew, with those closest to Hitler, including Prussian premier Hermann Göring, Propaganda Minister Joseph Goebbels, and Reichsführer-SS Heinrich Himmler, positioning themselves against Röhm. To isolate Röhm, on 20 April 1934, Göring transferred control of the Prussian political police (Gestapo) to Himmler, who he believed could be counted on to move against Röhm.

Both the Reichswehr and the conservative business community continued to complain to Hindenburg about the SA. In early June, defence minister Werner von Blomberg issued an ultimatum to Hitler from Hindenburg: unless Hitler took immediate steps to end the growing tension in Germany, Hindenburg would declare martial law and turn over control of the country to the army. The threat of a declaration of martial law from Hindenburg, the only person in Germany with the authority to potentially depose the Nazi regime, put Hitler under pressure to act. Hitler decided the time had come both to destroy Röhm and to settle scores with old enemies. Both Himmler and Göring welcomed Hitler's decision, since both had much to gain by Röhm's downfall—the independence of the SS for Himmler, and the removal of a rival for Göring.

Personal life and death

Röhm was known to be homosexual, which Hitler "tolerated". Röhm was also known for being a good organizer, a strong leader and having a brutal, unscrupulous manner; all of which served Hitler well politically, before the Nazis obtained national power in 1933.

In June 1934, in preparation for the purge known as the Night of the Long Knives, both Himmler and Reinhard Heydrich, chief of the SS Security Service, assembled a dossier of manufactured evidence to suggest that Röhm had been paid  (equivalent to € million ) by the government of France to overthrow Hitler. Leading officers in the SS were shown falsified evidence on 24 June that Röhm planned to use the SA to launch a plot against the government (Röhm-Putsch). At Hitler's direction, Göring, Himmler, Heydrich, and Victor Lutze drew up lists of people in and outside the SA to be killed. One of the men Göring recruited to assist him was Willi Lehmann, a Gestapo official and NKVD spy. On 25 June, General Werner von Fritsch placed the Reichswehr on the highest level of alert. On 27 June, Hitler moved to secure the army's cooperation. Blomberg and General Walther von Reichenau, the army's liaison to the party, gave it to him by expelling Röhm from the German Officers' League. On 28 June, Hitler went to Essen to attend Josef Terboven's wedding celebration and reception; from there he called Röhm's adjutant at Bad Wiessee and ordered SA leaders to meet with him on 30 June at 11:00 a.m. On 29 June, a signed article in Völkischer Beobachter by Blomberg appeared in which Blomberg stated with great fervour that the Reichswehr stood behind Hitler.

On 30 June 1934, Hitler and a large group of SS and regular police flew to Munich and arrived between 06:00 and 07:00 at Hanselbauer Hotel in Bad Wiessee, where Röhm and his followers were staying. With Hitler's early arrival, the SA leadership, still in bed, were taken by surprise. SS men stormed the hotel and Hitler personally placed Röhm and other high-ranking SA leaders under arrest. According to Erich Kempka, Hitler turned Röhm over to "two detectives holding pistols with the safety catch off". The SS found Breslau SA leader Edmund Heines in bed with an unidentified eighteen-year-old male SA senior troop leader. Goebbels emphasised this aspect in subsequent Nazi propaganda, justifying the purge as a crackdown on moral turpitude. Kempka said in a 1946 interview that Hitler ordered both Heines and his partner taken outside of the hotel and shot. Meanwhile, the SS arrested the other SA leaders as they left their train for the planned meeting with Röhm and Hitler.

Although Hitler presented no evidence of a plot by Röhm to overthrow the regime, he nevertheless denounced the leadership of the SA. Arriving back at party headquarters in Munich, Hitler addressed the assembled crowd. Consumed with rage, Hitler denounced "the worst treachery in world history". Hitler told the crowd that "undisciplined and disobedient characters and asocial or diseased elements" would be annihilated. The crowd, which included party members and many SA members fortunate enough to escape arrest, shouted its approval. 

Joseph Goebbels, who had been with Hitler at Bad Wiessee, set the final phase of the plan in motion. Upon returning to Berlin, Goebbels telephoned Göring at 10:00 with the codeword  ("hummingbird") to let loose the execution squads on the rest of their unsuspecting victims. Leibstandarte SS Adolf Hitler commander Sepp Dietrich received orders from Hitler to form an "execution squad" and go to Stadelheim prison in Munich where Röhm and other SA leaders were being held under arrest. There in the prison courtyard, the Leibstandarte firing squad shot five SA generals and an SA colonel. Several of those not immediately executed were taken back to the Leibstandarte barracks at Lichterfelde, given one-minute "trials", and shot by a firing squad. Röhm himself, however, was kept prisoner.

Hitler was hesitant in authorising Röhm's execution, perhaps because of loyalty or embarrassment about the execution of an important lieutenant; he eventually did so, and agreed that Röhm should have the option of suicide. On 1 July 1934, SS-Brigadeführer Theodor Eicke (later Kommandant of the Dachau concentration camp) and SS-Obersturmbannführer Michael Lippert visited Röhm. Once inside Röhm's cell, they handed him a Browning pistol loaded with a single cartridge and told him he had ten minutes to kill himself or they would do it for him. Röhm demurred, telling them, "If I am to be killed, let Adolf do it himself." Having heard nothing in the allotted time, Eicke and Lippert returned to Röhm's cell at 14:50 to find him standing, with his bare chest puffed out in a gesture of defiance. Eicke and Lippert then shot and killed Röhm. SA-Obergruppenführer Viktor Lutze, who had been spying on Röhm, was named as the new Stabschef SA.

Reactions to the purge
While some Germans were shocked by the killings of 30 June to 2 July 1934, many others saw Hitler as the one who restored "order" to the country. Goebbels's propaganda highlighted the "Röhm-Putsch" in the days that followed. The homosexuality of Röhm and other SA leaders was made public to add "shock value", even though it had been known to Hitler and other Nazi leaders for years.

On 3 July 1934 the purge of the SA was legalised with a one-paragraph decree: the Law Regarding Measures of State Self-Defence, a step that historian Robin Cross contended in 2009 was done by Hitler to cover his own tracks. The Law declared, "The measures taken on 30 June, 1 and 2 July to suppress treasonous assaults are legal as acts of self-defence by the State." At the time no public reference was made to the alleged SA rebellion, but only generalised references to misconduct, perversion and some sort of plot. 

In a nationally broadcast speech to the Reichstag on 13 July, Hitler justified the purge as a defence against treason. Before the events of the Night of the Long Knives concluded, not only was Röhm dead, but more than 200 additional people had been killed, including Nazi official Gregor Strasser, former chancellor General Kurt von Schleicher, and Franz von Papen's secretary, Edgar Jung. Most of those murdered had little to no affiliation with Röhm but were killed for political reasons.

In an attempt to erase Röhm from German history, all known copies of the 1933 propaganda film The Victory of Faith (Der Sieg des Glaubens)—in which Röhm appeared—were destroyed in 1934, probably on Hitler's order. However, at least one copy has survived destruction.

Decorations and awards
 Military Merit Cross (Bavaria) 4th Class with swords, 1914
 1914 Iron Cross 2nd Class
 1914 Iron Cross 1st Class, 1916
 1914 Wound Badge in Silver, 1918

See also

 Glossary of Nazi Germany
 History of Germany
 List of Nazi Party leaders and officials
 Persecution of homosexuals in Nazi Germany
 Röhm scandal
 Sexuality of Adolf Hitler

References
Informational notes

Citations

Bibliography

 
 
 
 
 
 
 
 
 
 
 
 
 
 
 
 
 
 
 
 
 
 
 
 
 
 
 
 
 
 
 
 
 
 
 
 
 
 

Further reading

External links

 
 

1887 births
1934 deaths
20th-century Freikorps personnel
Burials at the Westfriedhof (Munich)
Executed politicians
Gay military personnel
Gay politicians
German Army personnel of World War I
German murderers
German nationalists
German Völkisch Freedom Party politicians
German Workers Party members
German LGBT politicians
LGBT people in the Nazi Party
Members of the Academy for German Law
Members of the Reichstag of Nazi Germany
Members of the Reichstag of the Weimar Republic
Military personnel from Munich
National Socialist Freedom Movement politicians
Nazi Germany ministers
Nazis executed by firearm
Nazis executed by Nazi Germany
Nazis who participated in the Beer Hall Putsch
German people executed by Nazi Germany
People executed by Nazi Germany by firearm
People from Bavaria executed by Nazi Germany
People from the Kingdom of Bavaria
Recipients of the Iron Cross (1914), 1st class
Reichsleiters
Sturmabteilung officers
Victims of the Night of the Long Knives